Florin Pripici (born March 7, 1995 in Sinaia) is a Romanian cross-country skier.

Pripici competed at the 2014 Winter Olympics for Romania. He placed 68th in the qualifying round in the individual sprint, failing to advance to the knockout stages. He also teamed with Paul Constantin Pepene in the team sprint, finishing 9th in their semifinal and failing to advance.

Pripici made his World Cup debut in January 2014. As of April 2014, his best finish is a 54th, in a freestyle sprint event at Szklarska Poreba in 2013–14.

References

1995 births
Living people
Olympic cross-country skiers of Romania
Cross-country skiers at the 2014 Winter Olympics
People from Sinaia
Romanian male cross-country skiers
Cross-country skiers at the 2012 Winter Youth Olympics